The following lists events that happened during 1959 in South Africa.

Incumbents
 Monarch: Queen Elizabeth II.
 Governor-General: 
 until 25 November: Ernest George Jansen.
 25 November – 11 December: Lucas Cornelius Steyn.
 starting 11 December: Charles Robberts Swart.
 Prime Minister: Hendrik Frensch Verwoerd.
 Chief Justice: Henry Allan Fagan then Lucas Cornelius Steyn.

Events

April
 5 – The Pan-Africanist Congress led by Robert Sobukwe secedes from the African National Congress.

July
 9 – Wing Commander Michael Beetham flying a Royal Air Force Vickers Valiant sets a record of 11 hours 27 minutes for a non-stop London-Cape Town flight.

August
 11 – Members of the United Party led by Helen Suzman secede and form the Progressive Party.

December
 1 – Twelve countries, including South Africa, the United States and the Soviet Union, sign the Antarctic Treaty.
 11 – Charles Robberts Swart is appointed the 11th Governor-General of the Union of South Africa.
 12 – The 47th Annual Conference of the African National Congress takes place in Durban.

Unknown date
 Papwa Sewgolum, a South African Indian golfer, wins the Dutch Open tournament.

Births
 1 January – Thulas Nxesi, national minister
 7 January – Peter Mokaba, member of the South African parliament, deputy minister in the government of Nelson Mandela (d. 2002)
 14 March – Tertius Bosch, cricketer.
 16 March – Tito Mboweni, politician.
 16 September – Dave Richardson (cricketer), cricketer.
 18 November – Christine Barkhuizen le Roux, writer (d. 2020)

Deaths

 April 15 – Leonard Beyers, South African army general (b. 1894)
 February 7 – D. F. Malan, South African politician, 4th Prime Minister of South Africa (b. 1874)
 April 15 – Leonard Beyers, South African army general (b. 1894)

Railways

Locomotives
Three new Cape gauge locomotive types enter service on the South African Railways.
 May–July – Seven  Henschel type DH 1420 diesel-hydraulic locomotives.
 November – The first of 115 Class 32-000 General Electric type U18C1 diesel-electric locomotives in South West Africa.
 The first of 135 Class 5E1, Series 1 electric locomotives, an upgraded and more powerful version of the Class 5E.

References

History of South Africa